White flags have had different meanings throughout history and depending on the locale.

Contemporary use 

The white flag is an internationally recognized protective sign of truce or ceasefire, and for negotiation. It is also used to symbolize surrender, since it is often the weaker party that requests negotiation. It is also flown on ships serving as cartels. A white flag signifies to all that an approaching negotiator is unarmed, with an intent to surrender or a desire to communicate. Persons carrying or waving a white flag are not to be fired upon, nor are they allowed to open fire. The use of the flag to request parley is included in the Hague Conventions of 1899 and 1907:

The improper use of the flag is forbidden by the rules of war and constitutes a war crime of perfidy. There have been numerous reported cases of such behavior in conflicts, such as combatants using white flags as a ruse to approach and attack enemy combatants, or killings of combatants attempting to surrender by carrying white flags.

Origin
The first mention of the usage of white flags to surrender is made during the Eastern Han dynasty (AD 25–220). In the Roman Empire, the historian Cornelius Tacitus mentions a white flag of surrender in AD 109. Before that time, Roman armies would surrender by holding their shields above their heads.  The white flag was widely used in the Middle Ages in Western Europe to indicate an intent to surrender.  The color white was used generally to indicate a person was exempt from combat; heralds bore white wands, prisoners or hostages captured in battle would attach a piece of white paper to their hat or helmet, and garrisons that had surrendered and been promised safe passage would carry white batons.

Its use may have expanded across continents, e.g. Portuguese chronicler Gaspar Correia (writing in the 1550s), claims that in 1502, an Indian ruler, the Zamorin of Calicut, dispatched negotiators bearing a "white cloth tied to a stick", "as a sign of peace", to his enemy Vasco da Gama. In 1625, Hugo Grotius in De jure belli ac pacis (On the Law of War and Peace), one of the foundational texts in international law, recognized the white flag as a "sign, to which use has given a signification"; it was "a tacit sign of demanding a parley, and shall be as obligatory, as if expressed by words".

Early Islamic caliphates
The Umayyad dynasty (661–750) used white as their symbolic color as a reminder of Muhammad's first battle at Badr.

The Alids and the Fatimid dynasty also used white in opposition to the Abbasids, who used black as their dynastic color.

Ancien Régime in France
During the period of the Ancien Régime, starting in the early 17th century, the royal standard of France became a plain white flag as a symbol of purity, sometimes covered in fleur-de-lis when in the presence of the king or bearing the ensigns of the Order of the Holy Spirit.

The white color was also used as a symbol of military command, by the commanding officer of a French army. It would be featured on a white scarf attached to the regimental flag as to recognize French units from foreign ones and avoid friendly fire incidents. The French troops fighting in the American Revolutionary War fought under the white flag.

The French Navy used a plain white ensign for ships of the line. Smaller ships might have used other standards, such as a fleur-de-lis on white field. Commerce and private ships were authorized to use their own designs to represent France, but were forbidden to fly the white ensign.

During the French Revolution, in 1794, the blue, white and red Tricolore was adopted as the official national flag. The white flag quickly became a symbol of French royalists. (The white part of the French Tricolor is itself originally derived from the old Royal flag, the tricolor having been designed when the revolution still aimed at constitutional monarchy rather than a republic; this aspect of the Tricolor was, however, soon forgotten.)

During the Bourbon Restoration, the white flag replaced the Tricolore, which by then was seen as a symbol of regicide.

It was finally abandoned in 1830, with the July Revolution, with the definitive use of the blue, white and red flag.

In 1873, an attempt to reestablish the monarchy failed when Henri of Artois, the Count of Chambord refused to accept the Tricolore. He demanded the return of the white flag before he would accept the throne, a condition that proved unacceptable.

American Civil War

In 1863, the Confederate States adopted a new flag that played on the popularity of the Confederate Battle Flag, using a pure white field with the Battle Flag displayed in a canton (in a position equivalent to the stars on the flag of the United States). The white color, according to the Confederates, symbolized "supremacy of the white man over the inferior or colored race", and was dubbed "The White Man's Flag". The design lasted until March 1865, when concerns about its being mistaken for a flag of truce when the flag was not completely flying necessitated the addition of a broad red band on the fly edge.

Christianity

The Christian Flag, designed in the early 20th century to represent all of Christianity and Christendom, has a white field, with a red Latin cross inside a blue canton. In conventional vexillology, a white flag is linked to surrender, a reference to the Biblical description of Jesus's non-violence and surrender to God's will.

Racing

In FIA sanctioned races, a white flag warns of a slow car ahead. In non-FIA races, a white racing flag is displayed from the starter's tower to indicate that the race leader is running the final lap. The white flag can be pointed at the race leader to avoid confusion of other drivers. Drivers may wave a small white flag after a collision to indicate that they are uninjured.

In NASCAR and other racing leagues, a white flag symbolizes one more lap to go. After this, the checkered flag is waved. NASCAR sometimes has finishes that are coined as "green–white–checker finishes" because of the order of the flags waved lap after lap before the finish.

Buddhist and Confucian countries
In some Buddhist and Confucian countries, white is the colour of mourning, so a white flag is used where other cultures might fly a black flag.

Taliban

During the Afghan Civil War, the Taliban used a plain white flag. When it took over Kabul in 1996, and established the Islamic Emirate of Afghanistan, the white flag became the national flag of the country. After 1997, the Taliban added the Shahadah to the flag.

Minamoto clan
During the Genpei War (1180–1185), the Minamoto clan fought under a white flag while the Taira clan fought under a red flag. As successive shogunates were from the Minamoto clan, this usage continued to the end of Tokugawa shogunate in 1868 when the current international usage was adopted.

Derived flags
Flags intending to bring peace to a conflicted territory have been based on a defaced version of a white flag:
 The flag of Cyprus since 1960 is a white flag with a map of the island and olive branches (another symbol of peace).
 The flag of the Republic of Bosnia and Herzegovina between 1992 and 1998 was a white flag with the arms of the Kotromanić dynasty.

Nutopia
The conceptual country of Nutopia was created by John Lennon and Yoko Ono in 1973, as a satirical response to Lennon's then-ongoing immigration problems. The Nutopian flag is solid white. Some criticised the association with the white flag of surrender, but Lennon and Ono defended it as representational of compromise and peace.

Gondor
The flag of the Stewards of Gondor in the Middle-earth legendarium of J.R.R. Tolkien was solid white.

COVID-19 pandemic

In March 2020, the Belgian Royal Palace in Brussels raised a white flag to support and express gratitude for caring staff amid coronavirus outbreak. Many Belgians also displayed a white flag in front of their house for the same reason.

Malaysian people launched a movement with hashtag #benderaputih (English: #whiteflag) on social media, urging those struggling financially and in need of food and essentials to fly a white flag outside their homes.

In November 2022, several widespread protests happened in mainland China against excess government control over Covid restrictions. People fears of government censorship were holding a sheet of white paper to express their fears and angers to the government.

“Chinese protesters have turned to blank sheets of paper to express their anger over COVID-19 restrictions in a rare, widespread outpouring of public dissent that has gone beyond social media to some of China's streets and top universities.

Images and videos circulated online showed students at universities in cities including Nanjing and Beijing holding up blank sheets of paper in silent protest, a tactic used in part to evade censorship or arrest.”

See also
 Chamade, a musical equivalent of a flag  of truce
 "White Flag" (Dido song)
 "White flags over Port Stanley"
 List of flags
 Diplomatic flag
 List of flags by color combination#White
 Black Flag (disambiguation)
 Blue flag (disambiguation) (Blue Revolution)
 Green flag
 Red flag (disambiguation)
 Racing flags

References

Law of war
Types of flags
Flags by colour
Flag, white
Flags introduced in 1899